Blooming Grove can refer to:

Blooming Grove, Indiana
Blooming Grove Township, Indiana
Blooming Grove Township, Minnesota
Blooming Grove, New York
Blooming Grove Township, Pennsylvania
Blooming Grove, Ohio
Blooming Grove (Florence, South Carolina), a historic house
Blooming Grove, Texas
Blooming Grove, Wisconsin